Pretty Polly may refer to:

 "Pretty Polly" (ballad)
 Pretty Polly (film)
 Pretty Polly (opera)
 Pretty Polly (horse)
 Pretty Polly (hosiery)
 "Polly" (The Kinks song), sometimes mislabeled "Pretty Polly"